Margrit Kennedy (November 21, 1939, Chemnitz  – December 28, 2013, Steyerberg) was a German architect, professor, environmentalist, author and advocate of complementary currencies and an interest- and inflation-free economy. In 2011, she initiated the movement Occupy Money.

Career
Kennedy was an architect with a master's degree in Urban and Regional Planning and a Ph.D. in Public and International Affairs from the University of Pittsburgh Graduate School of Public and International Affairs. She worked as an urban planner in Germany, Nigeria, Scotland and the United States. In 1991, she was appointed Professor of Ecological Building Technologies at the Department of Architecture, Leibniz University Hannover.

Theory

Margrit Kennedy is most famous for her criticism against the money system and the interest, as well as her ideas on local and complementary currencies. She has stated that her work on ecological architecture in 1982 led her to the discovery that it is "virtually impossible to carry out sound ecological concepts on the scale required today, without fundamentally altering the present money system or creating new complementary currencies". Her most famous book—Interest and Inflation Free Money, Creating an Exchange Medium that Works for Everybody and Protects the Earth (1987) — has been revised several times and translated into 22 languages.

Family
Margrit Kennedy passed away in 2013 and was survived by her husband, Irish architect Declan Kennedy, and one daughter.

Bibliography
The inner city (Architects' year book) 1974
Building Community Schools: An Analysis of Experiences (Educational Building and Equipment Series, Volume 2) 1979
Interest and Inflation Free Money: Creating an Exchange Medium That Works for Everybody and Protects the Earth, first published in 1987 and updated repeatedly afterward, last time in 2006 (in German anyway). The English 1995 version is available online.
Designing Ecological Settlements: Ecological Planning and Building: Experiences in New Housing and in the Renewal of Existing Housing Quarters in Euro (Reflektierte Praxis) 1997
Handbuch ökologischer Siedlungs(um)bau. Neubau- und Stadterneuerungsproj... in Europa 1998
 Regionalwährungen. Neue Wege zu nachhaltigem Wohlstand (with Bernard A. Lietaer), Riemann, München 2006, 
 People Money: The Promise of Regional Currencies (with Bernard A. Lietaer and John Rogers) (Triarchy Press 2012)
Occupy Money, J. Kamphausen, Bielefeld 2011,

See also

 ANCAP
 Barter
 Bernard Lietaer
 Collaborative finance
 Community wealth building
complementary currencies 
 Credit money  
 Cryptocurrency
 Digital currencies
Ecofeminism
 Flex dollar
Interest Free Economy  
 List of Canadian community currencies
 List of community currencies in the United States
 Local currency
 Local exchange trading system

References

External links

Margrit Kennedy's Website
Kennedy Library
Audio interview in WINGS: Women's International News Gathering Service

1939 births
2013 deaths
20th-century German architects
Freiwirtschaft
German environmentalists
German women environmentalists
Monetary reformers
German women architects